The City of Southampton Swimming Club is the major swimming club in Southampton, Hampshire in the United Kingdom and is currently based at The Quays Swimming & Diving Complex near West Quay.

History
The club was founded in 1963 and was one of the earliest members of the UK's National Swimming League. It celebrated its fiftieth anniversary in May 2014.

The club has been National League winner on five occasions and Regional Division winner on fourteen.

Membership
 the club has approximately 250 members ranging from 5 years to masters, who compete at local, county, regional and national competitions.

Notable former members include:
 Gary Abraham, Olympic and Commonwealth Games medallist who is a current coach
 Keith Bewley, triple Commonwealth Games medallist
 Ricky Burrell, Olympian and triple Commonwealth Games medallist
 Colin Cunningham, Olympian and three times Commonwealth Games medallist
 Dave Haller, Olympian
 Alan Kimber, European medallist
 Malcolm O’Connell, Olympian
 Ray Terrell, seven times Commonwealth Games medallist

Coaches

The current head coach is Matt Heathcock who himself trained at Southampton when his father David Heathcock was the coach.

Current assistant coaches include Gary Abraham (ex Olympian), Aislinn Murphy and Brooke Wilkinson.

Notable former coaches include:
 Derek Snelling (founder) 1963
 Dave Haller (Olympian) 1967

References

External links
Club website
Club YouTube channel

Sport in Southampton
Swimming clubs in the United Kingdom